Miers Glacier is a small glacier north of Terminus Mountain in Victoria Land, Antarctica, occupying the upper (western) portion of Miers Valley. The glacier flows eastward with the meltwater from it and the Adams Glacier forming Miers Lake. It was mapped and named by the British Antarctic Expedition, 1910–13.

See also
Aorta Ridge, a ridge that separates upper Miers Glacier from Adams Glacier

References

Glaciers of Victoria Land
McMurdo Dry Valleys